Division 1 Svenska Serien Västra 1922–23 was part of the 1922–23 Swedish football season.

League table

References
 

1922 in association football
1923 in association football
1922–23 in Swedish football